Super key may refer to:

 Super key (keyboard button), modifier key on keyboards
 Superkey, database relation